The 1984–85 ACB season was the 2nd season of the ACB Primera División, the top Spanish professional basketball league. It started on 23 September 1984 with the first round of the regular season and ended on 1 May 1985 with the finals. In this season, the league introduced the new FIBA rules with the three-point field goal as the main change.

Real Madrid won their second consecutive ACB title, and their 24th Spanish title.

Teams

Promotion and relegation (pre-season)
A total of 16 teams contested the league, including 13 sides from the 1983–84 season and three promoted from the 1983–84 Primera División B.

Teams promoted from Primera División B
RCD Espanyol
Breogán Caixa Galicia
Atlético Madrid (sold its berth to Collado Villalba)

Venues and locations

First phase

Group Odd

Group Even

Second phase

Group A1

Group A2

Playoffs

Championship playoffs

Source: Linguasport

Relegation playoffs

Source: Linguasport

Final standings

References

External links
 Official website 
 Linguasport 

 
Spanish
Liga ACB seasons